Toyota Entune is an integrated multimedia navigation and telematics system for Toyota automobiles that provides satellite-based information on traffic, weather, sports scores, stocks, and fuel prices via subscription through SiriusXM. When connected to a compatible cellular phone running the Entune app via radio or USB cable, the system provides a browser and other apps including those from music services such as iHeartRadio, Pandora , and XM Satellite Radio. The cell phone app has iOS, Android, and Blackberry versions; to use this feature, a cell phone data plan is required. The system can be controlled with voice recognition, and may include the “Safety Connect” personalization system.

Built on the architecture of the existing Toyota G-Book service, Entune premiered in 2011 on the 2012 model year Toyota Prius v and is available in subsequent years.

The Lexus Enform application suite expands on the technology used by Entune.

Evolution of Entune Hardware 

Iterations of Entune are distinguished via the generation of the head unit. Beginning with 11CY, the evolution of head unit functionality parallels hardware capabilities.

Entune Version - 3.0 
Launched in 2017 in the 2018 Toyota Camry, Entune 3.0 is the current iteration of Toyota Motor North America's telematics and infotainment platform.  Entune 3.0 is a departure from previous Entune platforms, as it is based on the Automotive Grade Linux operating system as opposed to Blackberry QNX in previous versions.  As such, it is not compatible with Entune 2.x mobile applications and integrations.  However, this operating platform upgrade potentially enables many more third-party developer enhancements by moving to an open-source platform as opposed to the proprietary QNX system used in previous versions.

Entune 3.0 relies on an interface and app suite that is installed during vehicle assembly. Software and firmware updates can be made to the head units via a USB flash drive, and some versions of the head units can also be updated over the air (OTA).  In April 2019, Toyota announced that some backward compatibility would be possible for the 2018 Sienna and Camry vehicles.  The press release was noted as saying "The software enhancement is being provided at no cost" and would be made available via a software download to a USB flash drive from Toyota Information Services (TIS).  The published release date for this software is May 6, 2019.

Head unit trim levels 
The head units in the 2018 Camry are available in three levels. 

  Entune 3.0 Audio - Includes Touchscreen display, AM/FM Radio, Siri Eyes Free, Scout GPS Link with Moving Maps, Entune 3.0 App Suite, and Voice Recognition controls
  Entune 3.0 Audio Plus - Touchscreen display, Siri Eyes Free, Scout GPS Link with Moving Maps, Entune 3.0 App Suite, CD Player, AM/FM/HD (replaces AM/FM Radio), SiriusXM, Scout GPS Link with Moving Maps, Safety Connect, Service Connect, Remote Connect, Wi-Fi Connect, Available "JBL® with Clari-Fi™"
  Entune 3.0 Premium Audio -  Touchscreen display, Siri Eyes Free, Scout GPS Link with Moving Maps, Entune 3.0 App Suite, CD Player, AM/FM/HD (replaces AM/FM Radio), SiriusXM, Dynamic Navigation, Dynamic POI Search, Destination Assist Connect, Safety Connect, Service Connect, Remote Connect, Dynamic Voice recognition controls, Wi-Fi Connect, Available "JBL® with Clari-Fi™"

Head Unit Visual Identification

Entune Version - 3.0 Connected Services
Depending on the vehicle, subscription-based connected services for vehicles equipped with Audio Plus or Premium Audio head units may include:

 Service Connect
 Safety Connect 
 Remote Connect
 Wifi Connect
 Destination Assist
 Dynamic Navigation

In the 4th quarter of 2018, Toyota USA published a Telematics Services Status portal where people can confirm the performance of various USA-based connected services.  Available status includes: 

 Safety Connect
 Destination Assist
 Service Connect
 Remote Services
 Scout GPS Link
 Entune / Enform App Suite
 Entune 3.0 / Enform 2.0 App Suite
 Alexa Skill (Remote)
 Toyota+Alexa / Lexus+Alexa
 Lexus Drivers
 Toyota Owners
 Registration (Customer)
 Registration (Dealer)

Service Connect
Multiple vehicle status reports may be sent to the customer.

Vehicle health report
Contains vehicle data such as mileage, smart key battery status, engine oil quantity, fuel level, service history, recent changes to Toyota Personalized Settings, and more.

Maintenance alerts
A maintenance alert alerts vehicle owners to an array of statuses. If maintenance alerts are enabled, they may also be distributed to servicing dealers to support service.

Safety Connect

Automatic collision notification
In the event that the vehicle's airbags deploy or the vehicle is involved in a severe rear-end collision, a transmission will be made to the 24-hour Safety Connect response center. After attempting to speak to the occupants, the agent will notify local emergency services of the situation and direct them to the vehicle's location based on the GPS signal provided by the vehicle's embedded system.

Emergency assistance button (SOS)
Pressing the emergency assistance button (SOS) connects to a 24-hour Safety Connect response center. Using the vehicle's GPS technology, the agent can send emergency services to your vehicle's location while offering to stay on the line with you until help arrives.

Roadside assistance
Roadside assistance may be activated by pressing the Emergency Assistance button (SOS). Safety connect utilizes the GPS embedded in the vehicle to support roadside assistance efforts. Services may include support if the vehicle runs out of gas, a flat tire, a tow, or a jump start.

Stolen vehicle locator
The Safety Connect response Center can work with police once a police report is filed to help track and recover your stolen vehicle using Safety Connect's embedded cellular and GPS technology.  The Stolen Vehicle Location system works across the continental U.S.A.

Remote Connect

Vehicle finder
The Vehicle Finder supports vehicle location outside or in an uncovered parking lot to guide you back to your vehicle's last known parked location.

Engine start/stop
Remote engine starts/stop lets you remotely start your vehicle to warm or cool the interior based on the last climate-control settings. The engine or hybrid system will run for up to 10 minutes or until any door is opened, the brakes are pressed, or the engine is turned off remotely.

Remote door lock/unlock
Enables an owner the ability to remotely lock and unlock the vehicle's doors and receive confirmation if the action was successful. If the doors are unlocked remotely, the doors will automatically re-lock after 30 seconds if no further action takes place.

Wifi Connect

WiFi hotspot
Utilizes the AT&T network to support up to 5 devices with 4G LTE data transfer.

Destination Assist

Destination assist connect
Supports the ability to get directions and destinations delivered by an operator with 24-hour, en-route navigation assistance.  The agent can help the caller find a business, address, point of interest, or restaurant within a given proximity. Additionally, the agent can input the new navigation instructions with via points directly into the head unit.

Dynamic Navigation

Dynamic maps & route
Dynamic Navigation checks embedded map data against the cloud to download and store map updates. This navigation service uses the onboard and the off-board data to give navigation directions to the customer. It supports the ability to update maps and guidance based on changing road and traffic conditions.

Dynamic POI
Search an expanded database for points of interest with casual search terms, as if you were using an internet search box.

Entune 3.0 App Suite 
Entune 3.0 App Suite Connect offers access to mobile applications using the vehicle display by touch or voice command.  Applications included at the time of launch are:
  Pandora Radio Effective November 13, 2018, Pandora®, OpenTable, and Facebook Places are no longer available in Entune™ App Suite.
  Slacker Radio
  NPR One
  iHeartRadio
  Yelp
  Scout GPS Link with moving maps - Moving maps requires USB tethering. iOS users are required to run the application in the foreground to enable moving maps.
  
In addition to HD Radio, the digital signal supports the transmission of ancillary data:
  Fuel onboard
  Traffic off-board
  Sports
  Weather
  Stocks

Hardware/Software Version Couples (US Vehicles)
Firmware versions are available for download via the Toyota Information System, which requires a subscription to access. Additionally, some limited versions of firmware are available to the consumer via the owner's portal.

Availability
For US vehicles (model years):
2012–present 4Runner
2013–present Avalon
2013–present Avalon Hybrid
2012–present Camry
2012–present Camry Hybrid
2012–present Corolla
2013–present Highlander
2013–present Land Cruiser
2016–present Mirai
2012–present Prius, Prius v, Prius c, Prius Plug-in Hybrid
2012–present RAV4, RAV4 HV
2012–present Sequoia
2012–present Sienna
2012–present Tacoma
2012–present Tundra
2013–present Venza

For Entune 3.0
2018-present Camry
2018-present Sienna
2019-present C-HR
2019-present RAV-4
2019-present Avalon
2019-present Corolla Hatchback

See also
 G-Book (Toyota Japan)
 iDrive
 Microsoft Auto
 Ford Sync
 MyFord Touch
 Hyundai Blue Link
 Kia UVO
 UConnect Web
 Bluetooth
 Voice Recognition
 Infotainment
 Global Positioning System Device
 Safety Connect (Toyota)

References

External links

Toyota Entune Forum
Toyota Owners Registration Portal

Toyota
Vehicle telematics